Dance floor may refer to:
 Sprung floor, a floor to enhance performance and reduce injuries
 Performance surface or marley floor, flooring suitable for dance or sport
 Dance pad, a flat electronic game controller used for input in dance games
 Illuminated dance floor, a floor with flashing illuminated panels
 Portable dance floor, a mobile floor for dancing
 Dance Floor (horse) (foaled 1989), a retired American thoroughbred racehorse

Music 
 "Dance Floor" (song), a 1982 single by the funk group Zapp
 Dancefloor Chart, an MTV Europe chart of the ten most popular dance songs in Europe
 "Dancefloor", a song on Kylie Minogue's 2001 album Fever
 "Dance Floor", a song on T-Pain's 2005 album Rappa Ternt Sanga
 "Dancefloor" (song), a song on The Holloways's 2006 album So This Is Great Britain?

See also 
 The Dancing Floor, a 1926 novel by John Buchan
 Eurodance, a dance music style